This is the list of Mexican football transfers of the Mexican Primera Division during the summer 2015 transfer window, grouped by club. It only includes football transfers related to clubs from the Liga Bancomer MX, the first division of Mexican football.

Liga Bancomer MX

América

In:

Out:

Atlas

In:

Out:

Chiapas

In:

Out:

Cruz Azul

In:

Out:

Guadalajara

In:

Out:

León

In:

Out:

, previously on loan at Chiapas
, previously on loan at Mineros de Zacatecas
, previously on loan at Mineros de Zacatecas

Monterrey

In:

Out:

Morelia

In:

Out:

Pachuca

In:

Out:

Puebla

In:

Out:

Querétaro

In:

Out:

Santos Laguna

In:

Out:

Sinaloa

In:

Out:

Tijuana

In:

Out:

Toluca

In:

Out:

UANL

In:

Out:

UNAM

In:

Out:

Veracruz

In:

Out:

See also 
 2015–16 Liga MX season

References 

Summer 2015
Mexico
Tran
Tran